Giuseppe Maria Bondola, O.F.M. Conv. (1648–1713) was a Roman Catholic prelate who served as Bishop of Satriano e Campagna (1697–1713).

Biography
Bondola was born in Naples, Italy on 24 March 1648. He was ordained a deacon on 5 April 1670 in the Order of Friars Minor Conventual and then ordained a priest on 14 March 1671. On 2 December 1697, he was appointed during the papacy of Pope Innocent XII as Bishop of Satriano e Campagna. On 8 December 1697, he was consecrated bishop by Baldassare Cenci (seniore), Archbishop of Fermo, with Prospero Bottini, Titular Archbishop of Myra, and Sperello Sperelli, Bishop of Terni, serving as co-consecrators. He served as Bishop of Satriano e Campagna until his death on 4 February 1713.

References

External links and additional sources
 (for Chronology of Bishops) 
 (for Chronology of Bishops)  

17th-century Italian Roman Catholic bishops
18th-century Italian Roman Catholic bishops
Bishops appointed by Pope Innocent XII
1648 births
1713 deaths